Codes for electromagnetic scattering by spheres  - this article list codes for electromagnetic scattering by a homogeneous sphere, layered sphere, and cluster of spheres.

Solution techniques
Majority of existing codes for calculation of electromagnetic scattering by a single sphere is based on Mie theory which is an analytical solution of Maxwell's equations in terms of infinite series. Other approximations to scattering by a single sphere include: Debye series, ray tracing (geometrical optics), ray tracing including the effects of interference between rays, Airy theory, Rayleigh scattering, diffraction approximation. There are many phenomena related to light scattering by spherical particles such as resonances, surface waves, plasmons, near-field scattering. Even though Mie theory offers convenient and fast way of solving light scattering problem by homogeneous spherical particles, there are other techniques, such as discrete dipole approximation, FDTD, T-matrix, which can also be used for such tasks.

Classification
The compilation contains information about the electromagnetic scattering by spherical particles, relevant links, and applications.

Codes for electromagnetic scattering by a single homogeneous sphere

Codes for electromagnetic scattering by a layered sphere

Algorithmic literature includes several contributions

Codes for electromagnetic scattering by cluster of spheres

Relevant scattering codes
 Discrete dipole approximation codes
 Codes for electromagnetic scattering by cylinders

See also
 Computational electromagnetics
 Light scattering by particles
 List of atmospheric radiative transfer codes
 Optical properties of water and ice
 Mie theory

References

External links
SCATTERLIB: Collection of light scattering codes

Science-related lists
Scattering, absorption and radiative transfer codes